Hato Rey Sur is one of the 18 barrios of the municipality of San Juan, Puerto Rico. Hato Rey Sur was a barrio of the former municipality of Rio Piedras, before it was merged with the municipality of San Juan in 1951. Following the annexation of Rio Piedras, the city of San Juan, and its surrounding area now including Rio Piedras, quadrupled its former size.

Demographics

Hato Rey Sur has a population of 10,738 residents, with a population density of 13,095 residents per square mile.

Subbarrios
The barrio of Hato Rey Sur is further subdivided into four “subbarrios".
Bella Vista
Hyde Park
La 37
Santa Rita

Landmarks and places of interest 

 EDP University, Hato Rey Campus
 Judicial Center of San Juan
 Universidad Avenue, the main nightlife and dining spot for students of the UPR.
 The University of Puerto Rico's main campus is also located closeby.

Transportation 
Although the only Tren Urbano station to be fully located within Hato Rey Sur is Piñero, the Rio Piedras and Universidad stations also serve the barrio due to their close proximity.

Gallery

See also

Hato Rey
List of communities in Puerto Rico

References

Río Piedras, Puerto Rico
Barrios of San Juan, Puerto Rico